The Netherlands national cricket team toured India in March 1995 and played six matches against teams representing various areas of India. The touring Dutch team was captained by Steven Lubbers.

Matches

References

1995 in Dutch cricket
1995 in Indian cricket
India